Edward Hatch (December 22, 1832 – April 11, 1889) was a career American soldier who served as a general in the Union Army during the American Civil War. After the war, he became the first commander of the 9th U.S. Cavalry Regiment, a buffalo soldier regiment with African-American troops commanded by White officers.

Biography
Hatch, the son of Nathaniel and Elizabeth Scott Hatch, was born in Bangor, Maine, and educated at the Norwich Military Academy in Vermont.

As early as 1858, he was a resident of Muscatine, Iowa, where he engaged in the lumber business.

He volunteered for service as a private in the Union Army at the outbreak of the Civil War.  He assisted in raising the 2nd Iowa Cavalry, becoming its major in August 1861.  A few weeks later, he was commissioned its lieutenant colonel. In June 1862 on the promotion of Colonel Washington L. Elliott to brigadier general, he was made the regiment's colonel.

He served under General Ulysses S. Grant in the South. After commanding the entire cavalry division in the Army of the Tennessee, he was appointed and confirmed a brigadier general  in the spring of 1864. His gallantry in the field caused his further promotion to the rank of brevet major general later in 1864.

After the war, he transferred from the volunteer to the Regular Army as colonel of the 9th U.S. Cavalry Regiment (1866).  He succeeded General Gordon Granger as commander of the District of New Mexico (which included New Mexico Territory) in 1876, negotiated a treaty with the Ute Indians in 1880, and became widely known as an Indian fighter.

He died in Fort Robinson, Nebraska, on April 11, 1889, and is buried in Fort Leavenworth National Cemetery in Fort Leavenworth, Kansas.

See also

 List of American Civil War generals (Union)

References

 historycentral Accessed December 16, 2007

Buffalo Soldiers
Union Army generals
People of Iowa in the American Civil War
United States Army colonels
1832 births
1889 deaths
People from Bangor, Maine
Norwich University alumni